The National Olympic Committee (NOC) of the Saarland was founded in the spring of 1950 in the Saar Protectorate, which existed from 1947 to 1956 (German state of Saarland since), a region of Western Germany that was occupied in 1945 by France. As a separate team, Saar took part in its sole Olympic Games at the 1952 Summer Olympics before being allowed to rejoin the German team in 1956. Thirty-six competitors, 31 men and five women, took part in 32 events in nine sports.

History 
Just as after World War I, Saarland had initially been disallowed from uniting with the Weimar Republic and remained under military occupation for several years after the end of the war. After World War II, the Saarland was not allowed to become part of the Federal Republic of Germany after its founding in May 1949. The annexation of Saar by France, however, was prohibited by the other Allies and Points 2 and 3 of the Atlantic Charter.

As the local population did not want to join France, separate international organizations were founded, including the Saarland football team, and in 1950 a NOC, in German called Nationales Olympisches Komitee des Saarlandes.

Saar was first eligible to send athletes to the 1952 Winter Olympics, but did not do so due to a lack of competitive athletes in winter sports. Having a recorded history of over 500 years of coal mining, the Saarland did donate a miner's safety lamp in which the flame of the torch relay of the 1952 Summer Olympics in Helsinki could be carried safely aboard airplanes.

At the opening ceremony of the 1952 Summer Olympics, 41 athletes from the Saarland marched. The team was listed in the official report with a total of 44 men and 6 women athletes  and with 71 competitors, 16 officials, 11 spectators for a total of 98. The team won no medals and was ranked a joint 44th among a total of 69 teams.

Following a referendum in October 1955 that overwhelmingly rejected the Saar statute proposing Saar independence as a "European territory", the people of Saar indirectly resulted in favor of accession to the Federal Republic of Germany. The subsequent Saar Treaty of October 1956 allowed the Saarland to rejoin Germany effective as of 1 January 1957.

No separate Saarland teams were sent to the 1956 Olympic Games, as a United Team of Germany comprising athletes of all three German states took part for the first and only time. The Olympic Committee of the Saarland  formally dissolved in February 1957 as its members, like other separate institutions of the Saarland, became part of their German counterparts.

Notable competitors 
Therese Zenz (born 15 October 1932 in Merzig), a local champion, finished 9th in the canoe race at the 1952 Olympics, held on the open Baltic Sea, a new experience for the 19-year-old athlete from a landlocked country. She became world champion in 1954 in the K-1 500 m event. Competing for Germany in 1956, Zenz won a silver medal and won an additional two silvers in 1960. Zenz went on to coach gold medalists Roswitha Esser and Annemarie Zimmermann at the 1964 Olympics.

Medal tables

Medals by Games

Athletics

Men
Field events

Women
Track & road events

Field events

Boxing

Men

Canoeing

Men

Women

Fencing

Five fencers, all men, represented Saar in 1952.

Men's foil
 Karl Bach
 Ernst Rau
 Günther Knödler

Men's team foil
 Ernst Rau, Walter Brödel, Karl Bach, Günther Knödler

Men's sabre
 Ernst Rau
 Karl Bach
 Günther Knödler

Men's team sabre
 Karl Bach, Willi Rössler, Ernst Rau, Günther Knödler, Walter Brödel

Gymnastics

Rowing

Saar had seven male rowers participate in three out of seven rowing events in 1952.

Men

Shooting

Two shooters represented Saar in 1952.
Men

Swimming

Men

Wrestling

Men's Greco-Roman

References

External links
 
 
 
 Helsinki 1952 Official Olympic Report olympic-museum.de
 Helsinki 1952 Official Olympic Report la84foundation.org

Nations at the 1952 Summer Olympics
Saar at the Olympics
Saar at the Summer Olympics by year
1952 in Saar